Kimberly Elaine "Kim" Graham-Miller (born March 26, 1971, in Durham, North Carolina) is an American former sprinter who specialised in the 400 metres event. She represented the United States at the 1996 Summer Olympics in Atlanta, where she received a gold medal in women's 4x400 metres relay with Rochelle Stevens, Maicel Malone, and Jearl Miles, having run a very fast leg and passing a Nigerian team leading by several meters. She also competed in the women's 400 metres but did not advance past the semifinals. At the 1995 IAAF World Indoor Championships, she won third place in the  relay, along with her teammates Nelrae Pasha, Tanya Dooley, and Flirtisha Harris.

Coaching
Kim coached relays, sprints at UC Davis from 2010 to 2013.
Kim coached relays, springs at University of Illinois in 2013.

References

External links
 
 

American female sprinters
1971 births
Living people
Athletes (track and field) at the 1996 Summer Olympics
Olympic gold medalists for the United States in track and field
Clemson Tigers women's track and field athletes
World Athletics Championships medalists
Medalists at the 1996 Summer Olympics
Goodwill Games medalists in athletics
UC Davis Aggies track and field coaches
Illinois Fighting Illini track and field coaches
World Athletics Indoor Championships medalists
World Athletics Championships winners
Competitors at the 1998 Goodwill Games
Olympic female sprinters
20th-century American women